Malonaqen was a Meroitic king who probably governed in the first half of the 6th century BC.  His prenomen was "Sekhemkare."

He is thought to be the son of king Aramatle-qo and queen Amanitakaye, although this is based merely on assumptions.  His queen consort is thought to be Tagtal, who was buried at Nuri (Nu. 45).

Attestations
He is well known from his pyramid (Nu.5) at Nuri as well as by a votive cartouche from Kawa and on blocks (from temple M 242, 294) and other objects in Meroë. His pyramid at Nuri consists of the pyramid proper with a base length of 27.8 m. In front of the pyramid there was once a small chapel. The three underground burial chambers were reached by a staircase. The chambers were found looted, but still contained a number of objects, including the shabtis of the king and stone vessels inscribed with his name.

References

External links
Malonaqen

6th-century BC monarchs of Kush
6th-century BC rulers